Ma Li (born 3 March 1969) is a Chinese former footballer who played for the China women's national football team.

International career
At the 1991 FIFA Women's World Cup, central defender Ma played the full 80 minutes in all four of China's games. The hosts reached the quarter-finals before losing 1–0 to Sweden. Ma scored the first ever goal at a FIFA Women's World Cup after 22 minutes of the opening match; China's 4–0 win over eventual finalists Norway on 16 November 1991. She headed Wu Weiying's free kick from the right flank past Norway's goalkeeper Reidun Seth.

International goals

Personal life
Ma later emigrated to Brazil, where as of April 2016 she was working as a businesswoman.

References

External links
 

1969 births
Living people
Chinese women's footballers
Women's association football defenders
1991 FIFA Women's World Cup players
Asian Games medalists in football
Footballers at the 1990 Asian Games
Speranza Osaka-Takatsuki players
Nadeshiko League players
Expatriate women's footballers in Japan
Chinese expatriate footballers
China women's international footballers
Chinese expatriate sportspeople in Japan
Chinese expatriate sportspeople in Brazil
Asian Games gold medalists for China
Medalists at the 1990 Asian Games